The 2001 Sri Lanka Coca-Cola Cup was a One Day International (ODI) cricket tournament held in Sri Lanka in late June 2001. It was a tri-nation series between the national representative cricket teams of the Sri Lanka, India and New Zealand. Sri Lanka won the tournament by defeating India by 121 runs in the final.

Squads

Fixtures

1st ODI

2nd ODI

3rd ODI

4th ODI

5th ODI

6th ODI

7th ODI

8th ODI

9th ODI

Final

References

External links
 Series home at ESPN Cricinfo

Sri Lanka Coca-Cola Cup
Indian cricket tours of Sri Lanka
New Zealand cricket tours of Sri Lanka
Coca-Cola Cup
Sri Lanka Coca-Cola Cup
Sri Lanka Coca-Cola Cup
Sri Lanka Coca-Cola Cup
Sri Lanka Coca-Cola Cup
Coca-Cola